Colonel Christopher Wyborne Armstrong (9 May 1899 – 8 July 1986) was a politician from Northern Ireland.  He was Ulster Unionist Member of Parliament for Armagh from a by-election in 1954 until he stood down at the 1959 general election.

The son of Henry Bruce Armstrong, of Dean's Hill, Armagh, he married Hilde Kolz, with whom he had one son and daughter.  Studying at Winchester College and Trinity College, Cambridge, he retired to farm at Gilgil, Kenya.

His son, Simon W J Armstrong, married a daughter and co-heir of Diana Miller, Countess of Mértola.

References

1899 births
1986 deaths
Members of the Parliament of the United Kingdom for County Armagh constituencies (since 1922)
UK MPs 1951–1955
UK MPs 1955–1959
Ulster Unionist Party members of the House of Commons of the United Kingdom
Royal Engineers officers
People educated at Winchester College
Alumni of Trinity College, Cambridge
British Army personnel of World War II
Royal Artillery officers